The Shape of Things is Pere Ubu's fourth live album.  It documents a performance within the band's first few months of existence, from the brief period in which Peter Laughner was a member.  Initially produced only as a tour merchandise item, it has since been released to retail.

Track listing
All tracks composed by Pere Ubu (Dave Taylor, David Thomas, Peter Laughner, Scott Krauss, Tim Wright, Tom Herman); except where indicated
"Heart of Darkness" (Thomas, Laughner, Krauss, Wright, Herman) – 7:48
"Cloud 149"  – 3:20
"Gone Gone Gone"  – 5:38
"30 Seconds Over Tokyo" (Thomas, Gene O'Connor, Laughner) – 8:59
"Life Stinks"  – 2:30
"Final Solution" (Thomas, Craig Bell, Laughner, Krauss, Wright, Herman) – 6:41
"Pushin' Too Hard" (Sky Saxon) – 5:52
"The Way She Looks"  – 5:15
"Doris Day Sings Sentimental Journey"  – 5:16
"Can't Believe It"  – 2:39
"I Wanna Be Your Dog" (David Alexander, Iggy Pop, Ron Asheton, Scott Asheton) – 4:51
"Heroin/Outro" (Lou Reed) – 8:56

Personnel
Pere Ubu
David Thomas - vocals, harp
Peter Laughner - guitar, vocals, bass
Tom Herman - guitar, bass
Tim Wright - bass, guitar
Dave Taylor - EML synthesizer, Ace Tone organ
Scott Krauss - drums

References

Pere Ubu albums
2000 live albums